The Mosman House at 324 E. Oak St. in Fort Collins, Colorado was designed by architect Montezuma Fuller and was built in 1892 or 1893.  It has also been known as the Andrews House.  It was listed on the National Register of Historic Places (NRHP) in 1978.

According to its NRHP nomination, the house is "primarily significant as an outstanding example of Victorian
architecture in the City of Fort Collins".

References

Houses on the National Register of Historic Places in Colorado
Victorian architecture in Colorado
Houses completed in 1892
Buildings and structures in Fort Collins, Colorado
Houses in Larimer County, Colorado
National Register of Historic Places in Larimer County, Colorado